Kudappanakunnu is the headquarters of  Thiruvananthapuram district in the Indian state of Kerala.

Thiruvananthapuram Doordarshan Kendra and the District collectors office are the major landmarks here. Vazhayila, Nalanchira, Muttada and Mannanthala are some of the adjoining areas.

Kunnath Mahadeva Kshethram is an ancient Shiva temple situated in Kudappanakunnu. The temple is regarded as one of the existing 108 ancient Shiva Temples of Kerala Worshiped by Parashurama.

Special bus services have been started to connect Kudappanakunnu with city center and nearby areas. Thiruvananthapuram Central Railway Station is the nearest rail station. Trivandrum International Airport is the nearest airport.

Etymology
The name Kudappanakunnu comes from three words "Kuda", "Pana" and "Kunnu" meaning a hilly area occupied by Kudapanas, a variety of palm tree. Kudapana in turn means "Kuda" = Umbrella + "Pana" = palm tree. Kudappanakunnu has been widely regarded as the most beautiful and peaceful locality in Trivandrum city.

Prominent institutions
 Civil Station
 Doordarshan Kendram 
 National Coir Research & Management Institute (NCRMI)
 The Regional Poultry Farm and the District Livestock Farm
 Visweswara Institute Of Competitive Exams
 Corporation Zonal Office
 Govt. Veterinary Dispensary
 B S N L Exchange & BSNL Customer Service Centre
 KSEB office
 Government Homeopathy Dispensary.
 KSFE
Kerala State Youth Welfare Board

Educational Institutions
 Concordia Lutheran School and Church
 MaryGiri School EMHSS
 Kudappanakunnu Govt LP School
 St Thomas Residential School, Mukkola

Financial institutions
 Kudappanakunnu Sub Post Office
 State Bank of India
 Muthoot Fincorp
 KSFE
 Manappuram Gold
 Peroorkada Service Co-operative Bank

Religious
 Kunnath Sree Mahadeva Kshethram
 Kudappanakunnu Devi Kshethram
 Perapooru Devi Kshethram
 Thalayapooru Devi Kshetram
 kunnumpuram chamundi kshethram
 Manaykkakam Mahadeva Kshethram
 Concordia Lutheran Church Kudappanakunnu
 CSI Church Kudappanakunnu
 Seventh-day Adventist Church
 Fathima Matha Church Marygiri
Sri Radha Krishna Temple MLA Road Kudappanakunnu

Sub-roads
 Panchayath Office Lane
 Jayaprakash Lane
 Ganga Nagar
 Vivekananda Nagar
 Chandana Gardens
 Darshan Nagar
 VP Thampi Road
 MLA Road
 Concordia lane 
 NCC Road( Made BY NCC Cadets Camp At Concordia Lutheran School)
 Deya Nagar Residence Association Road
 Devi Lane
 Ganga Lane

Famous personalities
 Manikuttan

Nearby places
Peroorkada,
Mukkola,
Mannanthala,
Pathiripalli,
Nalanchira, 
Vazhayila
Perappuru,

References

Suburbs of Thiruvananthapuram